Casa Bernedo, also known as the Bernedo Ancestral House, is a two-storey ancestral house in Dipolog, Zamboanga del Norte in the Philippines.

History
The house was the residence of the then-influential Bernedo family of Dipolog. It was built by the turn of the 20th century by a Spaniard named Justo Bernedo and his wife Isabel Macias, a Filipina from Dipolog, where they raised their nine children together. The Bernedo house largely retained its original structure, only undergoing a minor renovation shortly after the end of World War II. Known to be an influential and a religious family in Dipolog's earliest days, the Bernedos hosted numerous dignitaries and VIPs who visited Dipolog in the house, including the town's Catholic church clergy and Philippine President Ramon Magsaysay.

Following the death of the last of the nine surviving Bernedo-Macias siblings in 2008, the Bernedo house was closed permanently. On July 1, 2012, the Bernedo house, now named Casa Bernedo, was reopened to the public as the Dipolog City Center for the Culture and the Arts in time for the city's centenary to be observed exactly a year later.

The house today
Today, Casa Bernedo serves as a museum and art gallery. The lower floor, which was said to be a small storage house or warehouse (commonly known as a bodega), serves as a venue for visual art and photography exhibits. Another room on the lower floor was used as a local gun store, until that space is currently occupied as the city's tourism office by the City Government of Dipolog.

The second floor, where the Bernedo-Macias family once lived, serves as a museum preserving the family house's interior and arrangements. The floors and their home appliances were all made out of Philippine hardwood, and their kitchen appliances were all imported from the United States. It was said that the kitchen, also on the upper floor, had a story on Dipolog becoming the Spanish sardine capital today when Isabel Macias Bernedo would make Spanish-styled sardines which she learned from her sister Concepcion Macias Montaño every summer. Casa Bernedo is open to the public free of charge.

References

See also
Dipolog
Dipolog Boulevard

Dipolog
Buildings and structures in Dipolog
Tourist attractions in Zamboanga del Norte
Cultural Properties of the Philippines
Landmarks in the Philippines
Museums in the Philippines
Heritage Houses in the Philippines